Irene Maguire (November 17, 1929 - April 10, 2016) was an American figure skater.  She competed in pairs and ice dance with Walter Muehlbronner, whom she married in 1951.  They won national silver medals in both pairs and ice dance in 1949 and 1950.  The two continued skating as professionals, billed as "Walter and Irene" for 7 years, in the Ice Follies.

Results
(pairs with Muehlbronner)

(ice dance with Muehlbronner)

Notes

American female ice dancers
American female pair skaters
1929 births
2016 deaths
20th-century American women